Quennell Lake is a lake located the eastern side of Vancouver Island, British Columbia, Canada. It is located between Ladysmith and Nanaimo in the area of Yellow Point. The lake is used extensively for recreational activities including swimming, canoeing, and fishing. The lake and surrounding wetlands are home to a wide range of birds and mature Douglas fir forest, and is considered a fragile ecosystem.

References

Lakes of Vancouver Island
Cedar Land District